The Sadlerochit Formation is a geologic formation in Alaska. It preserves fossils dating back to the Permian period.

See also

 List of fossiliferous stratigraphic units in Alaska
 Paleontology in Alaska

References
 

Permian Alaska
Permian northern paleotemperate deposits